Booton is an unincorporated community located in Wayne County, West Virginia, United States.

The community most likely takes its name from nearby Booten Branch creek.

References 

Unincorporated communities in West Virginia
Unincorporated communities in Wayne County, West Virginia